PEN Bangladesh is one of the 148 centers of PEN International. It is a bilingual society of Bangladesh-based writers, poets, publishers, editors, translators, journalists and academics, aimed at promoting literature and defending the freedom of expression in Bangladesh.

For the 2018-2020 period, the current president of PEN Bangladesh is Syed Manzoorul Islam, Rabindra University Vice  Chancellor Biswajit Ghose, writer Ahmed Reza and Maleka Ferdousi were elected vice presidents while Ferdousi Mahmud and Lovely Bashar were elected joint secretaries general of the committee.

History
Bangladesh PEN was originally established in the year 1948 soon after the partition of India as the then Pakistan PEN by Muhammad Shahidullah as its president and Syed Ali Ahsan as the secretary general. After the liberation of Bangladesh in 1971, the Pakistan PEN in Bangladesh was renamed as Bangladesh PEN.

Former presidents of PEN Bangladesh include: 

2021-Present (Dr. Kazi Anis Ahmed)

Secretary-General/ 2021- Present (Mohammad Moheuddin)

References

Bangladesh
Freedom of expression organizations
Literary societies
Organizations established in 1948
Bangladeshi writers
Bangladeshi activists